Grettell Valdez (born July 7, 1976) is a Mexican actress and former model.

Biography
Born in Querétaro, Mexico, Valdéz's first acting role was in a telenovela called Sin ti between 1997 and 1998.
In 1998 she made a special appearance in the José Alberto Castro's telenovela Ángela as Eloisa.
In 1999 she made a special appearance on Por tu amor as a younger version of Isaura Espinoza as Alejandra Avellán.

2000s: Clase 406 and Ángel rebelde 
In 2001 she again appeared in Mujer, casos de la vida real that starred Silvia Pinal. In 2002 she starred in series Clase 406 as Daniela alongside Aarón Díaz and Dulce María.

In 2004 she starred in a Venezuelan telenovela, Ángel rebelde as the protagonist alongside Victor Noriega and Maritza Rodriguez. She also had a supporting role in the Mexican teen series Rebelde as Renata Lizaldi.

In 2006, she co-starred in Roberto Hernández's telenovela, Heridas de Amor as Pamela Altamirano. She made a comeback to telenovelas in Lola, érase una vez alongside Aarón Díaz and Eiza González.

She appeared in one of the episodes of Mujeres asesinas. In 2009, she was one of the antagonists in Rosy Ocampo's telenovela, Camaleones.

2010s: Amorcito corazón and Lo que la vida me robó 
In 2010, Carlos Moreno featured her in Cuando me enamoro as Matilde along with Silvia Navarro and Juan Soler. In 2011, she was one of the protagonists in Lucero Suarez's Amorcito corazón as Zoe Guerrero.

In July 2013, she was confirmed to star as the antagonist in Angelli Nesma's Lo que la vida me robó alongside Angelique Boyer, Sebastián Rulli, Luis Roberto Guzmán and Daniela Castro.

In April 2015, she was confirmed to star as the main antagonist in Salvador Mejia's Lo imperdonable as Virginia Prado-Castello alongside Ana Brenda Contreras, Iván Sánchez and Sergio Sendel.

Personal life 
Valdez married her Rebelde and Angel Rebelde co-star, the actor and singer Patricio Borghetti, on 10 July 2004. At the start of 2008, she announced that they were expecting their first child. She gave birth to a baby boy, Santino, on July 25, 2008. In October 2009, it was confirmed by Patricio that the two had separated and were getting a divorce. The divorce was finalized in October 2011.

Filmography

Film

Television

References

External links
 

1976 births
Living people
Mexican telenovela actresses
Mexican television actresses
Mexican film actresses
20th-century Mexican actresses
21st-century Mexican actresses